Victoria Amelina (born 1986) is a Ukrainian novelist. She is the author of two novels and a children’s book, a winner of the Joseph Conrad Literary Award and a European Union Prize for Literature finalist.

Biography
Victoria Amelina was born in 1986 in Lviv. At the age of fourteen she immigrated with her family to Canada, but later she  returned to Ukraine. After completing  her degree in computer sciences, she spent, in her own words, a period of  “alien thirteen years” building a career in international hi-tech business. Since 2015, when her first book Синдром листопаду, або Homo Compatiens (The Fall Syndrome: about Homo Compatiens) was published, she has dedicated her time only to writing. Her debut novel deals with the events at Maidan in 2014, and the foreword was written by Jurij Izdryk. The novel has received several literary awards, and was welcomed by critics and scholars both from Ukraine and Europe.

In 2016, Amelina published a book for children called Хтось, або водяне серце (Someone, or Water Heart). In 2017, Amelina published a novel Дім для Дома (Dom's Dream Kingdom) about a family of a Soviet colonel who in the 90s lived in the apartment of the famous Polish author of Jewish origin Stanisław Lem.

The novel Дім для Дома (Dom's Dream Kingdom) was short-listed for a prestigious literary award LitAkcent in 2017 and European Union Prize for Literature in 2019.

Amelina is a member of PEN International. In 2018, she took part in 84th World PEN Congress in India as a delegate from Ukraine and gave a speech on Ukrainian political prisoner in Russia Oleg Sentsov.

Texts by Amelina have been translated into the Czech, Dutch, Polish, German and English languages.

In 2022, Victoria Amelina also started writing poetry.

As of 2022, Victoria Amelina lives in Kyiv and works as a war crimes researcher.

References

External links
 Victoria Amelina's essay at Eurozine.com, Cancel culture vs. execute culture. Why Russian manuscripts don’t burn, but Ukrainian manuscripts burn all too well
 Biography of Victoria Amelina at PEN International (Ukrainian branch) website
 Review of Victoria Amelina's Fall Syndrome novel in Ukrainian-German Slavic Studies project site 
 Review of Victoria Amelina's novel in Eastern Partnership Literary Review magazine by Czech scholar Tereza Chlaňová, PhD
An excerpt from the novel The Fall Syndrome by Victoria Amelina in Apofenie literary magazine
Victoria Amelina's speech on political prisoner Oleg Sentsov at the 84th World PEN International Congress in Pune, India
Victoria Amelina's column about Russian-Ukrainian war in Donbas affecting her family
Victoria Amelina's essay reflecting on the dramatic history of Ukraine including the Holocaust and Holodomor
 Victoria Amelina's novel short-listed for European Union Prize for Literature 

1986 births
Living people
Writers from Lviv
Ukrainian women novelists